Nepenthes petiolata (from Latin: petiolatus "petiolate", referring to leaf attachment) is a highland Nepenthes pitcher plant species endemic to Mindanao island in the Philippines, where it grows at an elevation of  above sea level.

Natural hybrids
? N. alata × N. petiolata
? N. petiolata × N. truncata

Nepenthes petiolata may itself have evolved from a cross between N. alata and N. truncata. Examples of other Nepenthes species with a putative hybrid origin include N. hamiguitanensis, N. hurrelliana, and N. murudensis.

References

Further reading

 Bauer, U., C.J. Clemente, T. Renner & W. Federle 2012. Form follows function: morphological diversification and alternative trapping strategies in carnivorous Nepenthes pitcher plants. Journal of Evolutionary Biology 25(1): 90–102. 
 Bonhomme, V., H. Pelloux-Prayer, E. Jousselin, Y. Forterre, J.-J. Labat & L. Gaume 2011. Slippery or sticky? Functional diversity in the trapping strategy of Nepenthes carnivorous plants. New Phytologist 191(2): 545–554. 
 Cantley, R. 2000. Nepenthes of the Philippines. [video] The 3rd Conference of the International Carnivorous Plant Society, San Francisco, USA.
 Co, L. & W. Suarez 2012. Nepenthaceae. Co's Digital Flora of the Philippines.
 Macfarlane, J.M. 1927. The Philippine species of Nepenthes. The Philippine Journal of Science 33(2): 127–140.
 Mann, P. 1998. A trip to the Philippines. Carnivorous Plant Newsletter 27(1): 6–11.
 McPherson, S.R. & V.B. Amoroso 2011. Field Guide to the Pitcher Plants of the Philippines. Redfern Natural History Productions, Poole.
  McPherson, S. & T. Gronemeyer 2008. Die Nepenthesarten der Philippinen Eine Fotodokumentation. Das Taublatt 60(1): 34–78.
 Meimberg, H., A. Wistuba, P. Dittrich & G. Heubl 2001. Molecular phylogeny of Nepenthaceae based on cladistic analysis of plastid trnK intron sequence data. Plant Biology 3(2): 164–175. 
  Meimberg, H. 2002.  Ph.D. thesis, Ludwig Maximilian University of Munich, Munich.
 Meimberg, H. & G. Heubl 2006. Introduction of a nuclear marker for phylogenetic analysis of Nepenthaceae. Plant Biology 8(6): 831–840. 
 Meimberg, H., S. Thalhammer, A. Brachmann & G. Heubl 2006. Comparative analysis of a translocated copy of the trnK intron in carnivorous family Nepenthaceae. Molecular Phylogenetics and Evolution 39(2): 478–490. 

Carnivorous plants of Asia
petiolata
Plants described in 1928
Endemic flora of the Philippines
Flora of Mindanao
Taxa named by Benedictus Hubertus Danser